Glycyphagus is a genus of astigs in the family Glycyphagidae. There are about five described species in Glycyphagus.

Species
These five species belong to the genus Glycyphagus:
 Glycyphagus destructor (Schrank, 1781) c g
 Glycyphagus domesticus (De Geer, 1778) c g
 Glycyphagus ornatus Kramer, 1881 g
 Glycyphagus pilosus Oudemans, 1906 g
 Glycyphagus privatus Oudemans, 1903 g
Data sources: i = ITIS, c = Catalogue of Life, g = GBIF, b = Bugguide.net

References

Further reading

External links

 

Acariformes